Danny Plett (1963) is a Canadian musician, songwriter, and music producer of Contemporary Christian music, who has worked in Germany and Canada.

Life and career 
Danny Plett was born in Steinbach, Manitoba with three siblings in a musical family. He began writing his own songs at the age of twelve and, after years of performing, released his debut You're The One at the age of 21. Tours through Canada followed, including US and Europe with B. J. Thomas and Silverwin.

From 1992 to 2013 Danny Plett lived in Germany and worked in the Janz Team as a musician. In addition to his own solo productions, he led the youth program One Accord for many years and published concept albums for children in the series Bible Verses Singing Learning. With Brian Delamont and Heinrich Reisich he founded the band Danny Plett & Liberation (abbreviated to DP&L or DPL). In 2006 he performed at the ProChrist in Munich, which was broadcast throughout Europe.
He wrote songs for German musicians, such as Cae Gauntt, Beate Ling, Anja Lehmann and Yasmina Hunzinger among others. His last CD was released by Gerth Medien with the title "Learn even more Bible verses by singing." He created this production with longtime colleague Hanjo Gäbler.

In 2013, Plett moved back to Canada with his family.

Discography

References 

1963 births
Living people
People from Steinbach, Manitoba
German Mennonites
Canadian Mennonites
Mennonite musicians